Jalal Khan Daudzai, known by his title Diler Khan, was a Mughal general who served under Aurangzeb and was the governor of Awadh. He was the son of Nawab Darya Khan Daudzai, a mansabdar of Pashtun Afghan ethnicity, who had migrated to India in 1603. He is known to battle and kill Murarbaji, the military general of Shivaji and the in-charge of Purandar Forts.

He was also responsible for the Mughal victory over Shivaji in the Battle of Bhupalgarh.

Campaign against Marathas
All of Aurangzeb's attempts to overthrow Shivaji went in vain. So he sent Jai Singh, along with Diler Khan to overthrow the Marathas and establish Mughal rule in the Deccan. Diler Khan insisted on capturing Purandar Fort. But Mirza Jai Singh, being a shrewd and experienced general, knew that hoisting the Mughal flag on Purandar will not be easy. So he advised Diler Khan to move his army on Vajragarh. Purandar Fort was a short distance from Vajragarh. If Vajragarh is captured, the Mughal cannons could easily capture the Purandar Fort. 

On 13 April 1665, Diler Khan was successful in capturing Vajragarh. The Mughal army under Diler Khan and Jai Singh celebrated the victory over Vajragarh with booming of guns. Diler Khan then turned his attention to Purandar.

On 16 May 1665, Diler Khan faced Murarbaji, the in-charge of Purandar Fort. Murarbaji fought valiantly but was killed by Diler Khan's arrow.

References

Mughal generals
Year of birth unknown
Year of death unknown
Place of birth unknown
Indian people of Pashtun descent